The Bliss-Leavitt Mark 9 torpedo was a Bliss-Leavitt torpedo developed and produced by the E. W. Bliss Company and the Naval Torpedo Station in Newport, Rhode Island in 1915. The Mark 9 was originally intended to be used on battleships. Before the Mark 9 could be issued, however, use of torpedoes on battleships was discontinued and Mark 9 torpedoes were placed in storage. These torpedoes were modified for deployment on R-class and S-class submarines, and used in early World War II to supplement the initial supply of Mark 14 torpedoes.  Torpedo production for the U.S. Navy was terminated by the E.W. Bliss Company about 1920 after completion of the Mark 9 project.

See also
American 21 inch torpedo

References

Torpedoes of the United States
World War II naval weapons
Bliss-Leavitt torpedoes